Magdaléna Rybáriková was the defending champion, but chose not to participate.

Alison Riske won the title, defeating Conny Perrin in the final, 6–2, 6–4.

Seeds

Draw

Finals

Top half

Bottom half

External Links
Main Draw

Fuzion 100 Surbiton Trophy - Singles